Dyson Clapier (born May 15, 2002), is an American soccer player who plays as a midfielder for Akron Zips.

Club career
After playing with the Portland Timbers academy, Clapier appeared for Portland's USL Championship side Portland Timbers 2 on August 31, 2019 in a 3-1 win over Reno 1868.

In 2020, Clapier attended Akron University to play college soccer.

During his 2021 season, Clapier appeared for USL League Two side Park City Red Wolves , scoring one goal in three appearances.

References

External links
 

2002 births
Living people
Akron Zips men's soccer players
Association football midfielders
American soccer players
Portland Timbers 2 players
Soccer players from Utah
USL Championship players
USL League Two players